The South Buffalo Railway  operates more than fifty miles of railway lines along the southeast shore of Lake Erie, in the United States. South Buffalo connects to CSX, Norfolk Southern, Canadian Pacific, and Canadian National Railway.

Historical connections
At one time the connections were with New York Central Railroad, Pennsylvania Railroad, Lehigh Valley Railroad, Baltimore and Ohio Railroad, Norfolk and Western Railway, Chesapeake and Ohio Railway, Delaware, Lackawanna and Western Railroad, and New York, Chicago and St. Louis Railroad.

Ownership
The South Buffalo Railway was sold by a private family in 2001 for $36.4 million to the Genesee and Wyoming Railroad. The main office is in Rochester, New York.

Major industries served 
Mittal Steel (formerly Bethlehem Steel)
Republic Steel Corporation
Ford Motor Company

Short Line Railroad of the Year

References

External links

New York (state) railroads
Switching and terminal railroads
Genesee & Wyoming